The 1953 Isle of Man Tourist Trophy saw Ray Amm (Rhodesia) win both Senior and Junior TT races. Bob McIntyre retired for his first TT, the Junior.

Senior TT (500cc)

Junior TT (350cc)

Lightweight TT (250cc)

Ultra Lightweight TT (125cc)

Clubmans 1000 TT

Clubmans Senior TT

Clubmans Junior TT

Sources

External links
Detailed race results
Isle of Man TT winners

Isle of Man Tt
Tourist Trophy
Isle of Man TT
Isle of Man TT